Princess Charlotte of Wales (Charlotte Elizabeth Diana; born 2 May 2015) is a member of the British royal family. She is the second child and only daughter of William, Prince of Wales, and Catherine, Princess of Wales. As a granddaughter of King Charles III, she is third in the line of succession to the British throne.

Birth
Princess Charlotte was born on 2 May 2015 in the Lindo Wing of St Mary's Hospital, London, at 08:34 BST, during the reign of her great-grandmother Queen Elizabeth II as the second child of the Duke and Duchess of Cambridge. Several landmarks were illuminated pink to mark her birth, including Tower Bridge, the London Eye, and the Trafalgar Square fountains; there were also gun salutes at Hyde Park and the Tower of London. On 4 May, her name was announced as Charlotte Elizabeth Diana, honouring her grandfather Charles ("Charlotte" being a feminine form of "Charles"), her great-grandmother, and her grandmother Diana, Princess of Wales. She has been affectionately called "Lottie" and "Mignonette" by her parents.

Upbringing 
On 5 July 2015, Charlotte was christened by the Archbishop of Canterbury at St Mary Magdalene Church, Sandringham, the same church where her paternal grandmother was christened in 1961. Her godparents are her parents' cousins Laura Fellowes and Adam Middleton, and family friends Thomas van Straubenzee, James Meade, and Sophie Carter. Princess Charlotte wore the royal christening gown, and the ceremony used the Lily Font, which was made for Princess Victoria, with water from the River Jordan.

The family lived in Anmer Hall in Norfolk during Charlotte's infancy, before moving to primarily living in Kensington Palace in 2017.  In 2022, the family moved to Adelaide Cottage in Windsor Home Park. On 8 September 2022, Charlotte's great-grandmother Elizabeth II died and was succeeded as monarch by her grandfather as Charles III. As such, Charlotte became third in line to the throne. The next day, Charlotte's parents were made the Prince and Princess of Wales giving her the new title of "Princess Charlotte of Wales".

Education 
Charlotte started her education at the Willcocks Nursery School, near her family's home in Kensington Palace, in January 2018. She joined her brother Prince George at Thomas's School in Battersea in September 2019, where she was known as Charlotte Cambridge. Charlotte and her siblings began attending Lambrook, an independent preparatory school in Berkshire in September 2022.

Official appearances

On 11 June 2016, she made her first public appearance, which was on the balcony of Buckingham Palace during Trooping the Colour. She accompanied her parents and elder brother, George, on their royal tour of Canada in September 2016 and on their diplomatic visit to Poland and Germany in July 2017. In December 2019, Charlotte and George both attended their first Sandringham Christmas Day Service at St Mary Magdalene.

In March 2020, she joined her siblings, George and Louis, in an online video to applaud key workers during the coronavirus pandemic. In September 2020, they met David Attenborough; Kensington Palace subsequently released a video of them asking Attenborough questions regarding environmental conservation. On 11 December 2020, the children made their first red carpet appearance accompanying their parents to the London Palladium for a performance of a pantomime held to thank key workers for their efforts during the pandemic. On 20 June 2021, Charlotte and George accompanied their father to start a Father's Day half-marathon race for the Run Sandringham event on the Sandringham Estate.

On 29 March 2022, Charlotte accompanied her parents and elder brother to a service of thanksgiving for the life of the late Prince Philip, Duke of Edinburgh. On 2 June 2022, during her great-grandmother's Platinum Jubilee celebration weekend, Charlotte and her siblings made their debut in the Trooping the Colour carriage procession. The procession was followed by a flypast, during which all three Cambridge children joined their parents, The Queen, and other working royals on the Buckingham Palace balcony. A couple of days later, on 4 June, Charlotte and George made their first official visit to Wales with their parents, where they attended concert rehearsals in Cardiff Castle, part of the Platinum Jubilee celebrations. Later that same day, Charlotte and George accompanied their parents to the Platinum Party at the Palace.

The next day, on 5 June, Charlotte attended the Platinum Jubilee Pageant with her parents and brothers. Following the pageant she joined her parents, brothers, the Queen, the Prince of Wales, and the Duchess of Cornwall on the Buckingham Palace balcony.

On 19 September 2022, Charlotte and her brother Prince George, accompanied by their parents, attended the state funeral of their paternal great-grandmother Queen Elizabeth II.

In the media
Despite the efforts of her parents to shelter their children from the press, each photograph or public appearance of Charlotte has caused a media frenzy. According to shopping statistics and polls among parents, Charlotte is a major children's style icon. Retailers, particularly in clothing, benefit greatly from their products appearing in photographs of the Princess. The phenomenon has been referred to as the "Princess Charlotte effect" or "Charlotte effect". Brand Finance have estimated that she will be worth more than £3 billion to the British economy throughout her lifetime. In July 2018, Reader's Digest valued her at $5 billion or £3.8 billion.

Title and styles
Charlotte is a British princess with the official style and title "Her Royal Highness Princess Charlotte of Wales". Before her father was created Prince of Wales on 9 September 2022, Charlotte was styled "Her Royal Highness Princess Charlotte of Cambridge".

Succession 
Charlotte is third in the line of succession to the British throne, after her father, and elder brother. Due to the implementation of the Perth Agreement, which replaced male-preference primogeniture with absolute primogeniture, she did not move down the line of succession when her younger brother, Prince Louis, was born on 23 April 2018; this makes her the first British princess to rank above a brother in the line of succession.

See also

 Family tree of the British royal family
 List of living British princes and princesses

Notes

References

External links
 Princess Charlotte at the Royal Family website
 

|-

2015 births
Living people
21st-century British people
21st-century British women
British princesses
Children of William, Prince of Wales
Daughters of British dukes
English children
English people of Danish descent
English people of German descent
English people of Greek descent
English people of Russian descent
English people of Scottish descent
Family of Charles III
House of Windsor
Middleton family (British)
Mountbatten-Windsor family
People from London
Royal children